Radanovići may refer to:

 Radanovići, Kiseljak, village in Bosnia and Herzegovina
 Radanovići, Kotor, village in Montenegro

See also
Radanović, people with the surname
 Radinovići (disambiguation)